Joseph Potter (1756–1842), was an English architect and builder from Lichfield, Staffordshire in the United Kingdom. Potter had a considerable practice in Staffordshire and its neighbouring counties in the late eighteenth and early nineteenth century. Potter lived in Pipehill, south-west of Lichfield, and had his office in St John's Street. Joseph Potter's son Joseph Potter Jnr. took over his father's practice after his death and went on to design many of his own buildings in the late nineteenth century.

Biography

Early in Joseph Potter's career as an architect, he was employed by James Wyatt (a prominent architect at the time) to supervise the alterations to Lichfield Cathedral in 1788–93 and Hereford Cathedral in 1790–93. In this period he also worked under Wyatt in the repair to St Michael's Church, Coventry (now St Michael's Cathedral) in 1794 and the rebuilding of Plas Newydd, Anglesey for the 1st Marquess of Anglesey. At Plas Newydd it is thought Potter is solely responsible for the design and build of the gothic chapel.

Potter became the established architect at Lichfield Cathedral, overseeing repairs to the south-west spire in 1794, the restoration of the vaults in the north transept in 1795–97 and restoration of the west face of the cathedral in 1820–22. Potter was the county surveyor of Staffordshire for 45 years until his death in 1842. Potter was also an engineer for the Grand Trunk Canal Company.

Potter had three sons who all carried on the family profession. Robert Potter (c. 1795–1854) was the eldest son; he became an architect and went on to design numerous buildings. Joseph Potter Jnr. (c. 1797–1875) took over his fathers practice after his death and went on to design many buildings including the Guildhall and Clock Tower in Lichfield. James Potter (c. 1801–1857) the youngest son became a civil engineer working mainly on canals and railways. Other architects Thomas Johnson and James Fowler of Louth were pupils of Joseph Potter and were influenced by his methods.

List of architectural works
1788–93 – Lichfield Cathedral (restorations with James Wyatt)
1790–93 – Hereford Cathedral (restorations with James Wyatt)
1793 – The Old Vicarage, Hanbury, Staffordshire
1794 – Lichfield Cathedral (repairs to south west spire)
1794 – St Michael's Church (now Cathedral) Coventry, (repaired tower with James Wyatt)
1795–97 – Lichfield Cathedral (restoration of vaults in north transept)
1795–1823 – Plas Newydd, Anglesey (with James Wyatt, solely responsible for gothic chapel)
1800-2 – Newton's College, Lichfield
1802 – Judge's House, County Buildings, Stafford
1816 – Causeway Bridge, Bird Street, Lichfield
1818 – School House, Market Place, Penkridge
1818 – St Michael's Church (now Cathedral), Coventry (restoration)
1818 – Staffordshire General Lunatic Asylum, Stafford
1819–20 – Christ Church, Burntwood
1820–22 – Lichfield Cathedral (restoration to west front)
1822 – Caernarfon Baths & Assembly Rooms (now part of Bangor University)
1824 – Chetwynd Bridge, Alrewas
1826–27 – Freeford Hall, nr Lichfield, (enlarged for William Dyott)
1826–29 – St Mary's Church, Sheffield
1826–31 – Beaudesert House (alterations to gothic hall)
1829–30 – High Bridge, Armitage
1829–30 – St John Baptist Church, Tamworth
1832 – Sts Peter & Paul Church, Newport
1833–34 – Wadsley Church, Sheffield
1835 – Holy Cross Church, Lichfield
1835–38 – St Mary's RC College, New Oscott

Gallery

See also

James Wyatt

References

18th-century English architects
19th-century English architects
1842 deaths
1756 births
English ecclesiastical architects
People from Lichfield
Architects from Staffordshire